Wallace Lupino (23 January 1898 – 11 October 1961) was a British-born stage and film actor who was a member of the Lupino family. He appeared in 63 films between 1918 and 1945, most often with his older brother, Lupino Lane. He was born in Edinburgh, Scotland, and died in Ashford, Kent, England.

Selected filmography

 The Fighting Dude (1925)
 His Private Life (1926)
 Children of Chance (1930)
 Never Trouble Trouble (1931)
 No Lady (1931)
 Josser on the River (1932)
 The Innocents of Chicago (1932)
 The Bad Companions (1932)
 The Melody-Maker (1933)
 The Stolen Necklace (1933)
 Trust the Navy (1935)
 The Deputy Drummer (1935)
 The Student's Romance (1935)
 The Man Who Could Work Miracles (1936)
 Love Up the Pole (1936)
 Hot News (1936)
 The Lambeth Walk (1939)
 Waterloo Road (1945)

See also
 Lupino family

References

External links

1898 births
1961 deaths
English male stage actors
English male film actors
English male silent film actors
Male actors from Edinburgh
British expatriates in the United States
Wallace
20th-century English male actors